Pedro Miguel Ferreira de Oliveira (born 30 November 1981) is a Portuguese former football midfielder.

Club career
After more than one decade in the youth academy of Boavista F.C. in his hometown of Porto, Oliveira moved to neighbours FC Porto at the age of 18, where he was largely unsuccessful, going on to serve loans for the following two and a half years and starting at Académica de Coimbra in January 2003. In the 2005–06 season he signed for Vitória F.C. in a permanent deal, having played there the previous year on loan.

In the summer of 2006, Oliveira left for Romania's CFR Cluj along with a handful of Portuguese players. In his first year he was an important first-team member as the team finished third in Liga I and qualified for the UEFA Cup, but he was deemed surplus to requirements in the following campaign, being loaned to fellow league club UTA Arad.

Oliveira moved countries again in 2008–09, joining Modena F.C. in Italy. The following summer, also in Italy, he signed with modest A.C. Arezzo (third level), on a free transfer.

Honours
Vitória Setúbal
Taça de Portugal: 2004–05

CFR Cluj
Liga I: 2007–08

Créteil
Championnat National: 2012–13

References

External links

1981 births
Living people
Footballers from Porto
Portuguese footballers
Association football midfielders
Primeira Liga players
Liga Portugal 2 players
Segunda Divisão players
FC Porto B players
FC Porto players
Associação Académica de Coimbra – O.A.F. players
Leixões S.C. players
Vitória F.C. players
Portimonense S.C. players
Padroense F.C. players
Liga I players
CFR Cluj players
FC UTA Arad players
Serie B players
Serie C players
Modena F.C. players
S.S. Arezzo players
Pisa S.C. players
Ligue 2 players
Championnat National players
US Créteil-Lusitanos players
Portugal youth international footballers
Portugal under-21 international footballers
Portuguese expatriate footballers
Expatriate footballers in Romania
Expatriate footballers in Italy
Expatriate footballers in France
Portuguese expatriate sportspeople in Romania
Portuguese expatriate sportspeople in Italy
Portuguese expatriate sportspeople in France